Đukić (also transliterated Djukić) is a Serbian surname, derived from the male given name "Đuka", itself a diminutive of Đorđe (George). It is predominantly found in Serbia and Montenegro. It may refer to:

Notable people
 Budimir Đukić (born 1977), Serbian football player
 Darko Đukić (born 1994), Serbian handball player
 Dragan Đukić (born 1987), Swiss football player
 Dragan Đukić (handballer) (born 1962), Serbian handball coach
 Duško Dukić (born 1986), Serbian football player
 Ilija Đukić (1930–2002), Serbian diplomat, former foreign minister of Yugoslavia
 Milan Đukić (Serb People's Party leader) (1947–2007), Croatian Serb politician
 Milan Đukić (Vojvodina politician) (born 1975), Serbian politician
 Milan Đukić (handballer) (born 1985), Serbian handball player
 Milonja Đukić (born 1965), former Yugoslav and Montenegrin football player
 Miroslav Đukić (born 1966), former football player and former Serbia national team manager
 Slađan Đukić (born 1966), Serbian football player
 Slavica Đukić (born 1960), female handball player
 Slavica Đukić Dejanović (born 1951), Serbian politician
 Svetomir Đukić (1882–1960),  founder of Olympic Committee of Serbia, officer in Serbian Army, general in Chetnik movement
 Vladislav Đukić (born 1962), Serbian football player
 Zvonimir Đukić, singer in Van Gogh (band)

Other
 Đukić, a brotherhood of the Vasojevići

See also
 Đukanović
 Đokić
 Jukić

Serbian surnames
Slavic-language surnames
Patronymic surnames